Hinoto may refer to:

Hinoto, a former Japanese village which was merged in 1889 into Tamayama, Iwate
, the Japanese name for the fourth of the Heavenly Stems
, a marker used in Japanese kanbun

People and fictional characters with the name Hinoto include:
Alberto Hinoto (1970–1996), Brazilian guitarist, member of Mamonas Assassinas
Princess Hinoto, character in the manga series X
Hinoto Kashibana, character in the light novel series Oresuki
Go Hinoto and Tyra Hinoto, characters in the manga series Biomega